Coin Nord de Mitsamiouli is a Comorian football club located in Mitsamiouli, Comoros. It currently plays in Comoros Premier League.

Titles
Comoros Premier League: 7
1980, 1986, 1990, 2001, 2005, 2007, 2011
Comoros Cup: 5
1983, 1987, 1988, 2003, 2011

Performance in CAF competitions
CAF Champions League: 3 appearances
2006 – Preliminary Round
2008 – Preliminary Round
2012 – Preliminary Round

External links
Team profile – Soccerway.com

Football clubs in the Comoros
1960 establishments in the Comoros